In the 2011 season, Djurgårdens IF competes in the Allsvenskan and Svenska Cupen.
Lennart Wass and Carlos Banda were contracted as coaches.

On May 3, after only taking 1 out of 18 points, Djurgården sacked Lennart Wass and contracted Magnus Pehrsson as manager. Banda is still left and co-manages the team with Pehrsson.

Sports director Stefan Alvén chose to leave the club on May 4 after responding to threats from angry supporters on him and his family.

Squad
 According to dif.se
 updated October 25, 2010

U21 squad

Transfers

Players in

Players out

Squad stats
Last updated on 5 July 2011.

|}

Disciplinary record

Club

Coaching staff

Other information

Matches

Pre season

Top scorers Pre season

Competitive

Allsvenskan

Results summary

Results by round

Top scorers Allsvenskan

Svenska Cupen

|}

Supporter incident
Djurgården were involved in an incident at Swedbank Stadion, in a match against Malmö FF, on 30 July 2011. The match was abandoned after eleven minutes, with Malmö FF at that time leading 1–0. The minute before, Djurgårdens IF forward Daniel Sjölund was given a yellow card. Six fireworks were launched, forcing referee Martin Hansson to abandon the match. According to Canal+, one of the fireworks was close to hitting a photographer. There were different opinions as to where the fireworks came from: Canal+ believed that the fireworks came from the section above the Djurgården terrace while the police believed that the fireworks came from within the Djurgården section. Swedish Discipline Committee chairman Khennet Thallinger stated that they "want to preserve the due process". On 5 September 2011, the Committee decided that the game would be replayed from kick-off. The Committee explained that the evidence saying Djurgården were responsible for the firecrackers was not considered strong enough to blame them. As such, neither Djurgården nor Malmö were fined any sums of money. The SFA's Competition Committee decided that the rematch would be played on 15 October 2011. This forced the Committee to delay the Halmstad–Djurgården and Malmö–Syrianska games in-between to 17 October, as all Allsvenskan teams should have at least two rest-days between each game. Djurgården lost the rematch 1–0.

References

Djurgarden
Djurgårdens IF Fotboll seasons